The Districts of Ghana are second-level administrative subdivisions of Ghana, below the level of region. There are 261 local metropolitan, municipal and district assemblies (or MMDA's).

History 
The districts of Ghana were re-organized in 1988/1989 in an attempt to decentralize the government and to assist in development. The reform of the late 1980s subdivided the regions of Ghana into 110 districts, where local district assemblies should deal with the local administration. By 2006, an additional 28 districts were created by splitting some of the original 110, bringing their number up to 138. In February 2008, there were more districts created and some were upgraded to municipal status. This brought the final number to 170 districts in Ghana. Since then, a further 46 districts have been added since 28 June 2012 bringing the total to 216 districts.

Types of Districts
Districts are classified into three types: 
Ordinary Districts with a minimum population of seventy-five thousand (75,000) people,
Municipal Districts with a minimum population of ninety-five thousand (95,000) people,
and
Metropolitan Districts with a minimum population of two hundred and fifty thousand(250,000) people.

Governance and administration

District Assemblies
Districts are governed by District Assemblies, which are established by the Minister of Local Government, and serve as the highest political authority in each district. They consist of:
 the District Chief Executive, appointed by the President of the Republic
 one person from each electoral area within the district elected by universal adult suffrage 
 the member or members of Parliament from the constituencies that fall within the area of authority of the District Assembly
 other members that shall not exceed thirty per cent of the total membership of the District Assembly appointed by the President in consultation with the traditional authorities and other interest groups in the district

District Chief Executive
The District Chief Executive is appointed by the President of the Republic and serves as the representative of the Central Government in the district. The incumbent presides at meetings of the Executive Committee of the District Assembly, and is responsible for:
 the day-to-day performance of the executive and administrative functions of the District Assembly
 the supervision of the departments of the District Assembly

Executive committee
The Executive Committee exercises the executive and coordinating functions of the District Assembly, and has the following members:
 the District Chief Executive, who serves as chairperson
 the chairpersons of the following Sub-Committees of the Executive Committee:
 Development Planning,
 Social Services
 Works
 Justice and Security
 Finance and Administration
 the chairperson of one ad hoc Sub-Committee of the Executive Committee elected by the District Assembly
 any two other members elected by members of the District Assembly, at least one of whom is a woman

Presiding Member
Each District Assembly elects a Presiding Member from among their number, who convenes and presides at meetings of the District Assembly.

Functions of District Assemblies
As the political and administrative authorities over the districts, the primary function of District Assemblies is to promote local economic development.

The Local Government Act of 2016 also tasks District Assemblies to:
 formulate and execute plans, programs and strategies for the effective mobilization of the resources necessary for the overall development of the district
 promote and support productive activity and social development in the district and remove any obstacles to initiative and development
 sponsor the education of students from the district to fill particular manpower needs of the district especially in the social sectors of education and health, making sure that the sponsorship is fairly and equitably balanced between male and female students
 initiate programs for the development of basic infrastructure and provide municipal works and services in the district
 be responsible for the development, improvement and management of human settlements and the environment in the district
 in co-operation with the appropriate national and local security agencies, be responsible for the maintenance of security and public safety in the district
 ensure ready access to courts in the district for the promotion of justice
 act to preserve and promote the cultural heritage within the district
 initiate, sponsor or carry out studies that may be necessary for the discharge of any of their duties

The Act also grants the District Assemblies with the following authorities:
 Auction sales, as provided by the Auction Sales Act, 1989 (P.N.D.C.L. 230)
 Liquor licensing, as provided by the Liquor Licensing Act, 1970 (Act 331)
 Control bushfires, as provided by the Control and Prevention of Bushfires Act, 1990 (P.N.D.C.L. 229)*
 Execute the following provisions of the Criminal Offences Act, 1960 (Act 29) within its district: section 296 in respect of throwing rubbish in the street; and section 300 in respect of stray cattle

List of Districts

Ahafo Region

The Ahafo Region of Ghana was created by a referendum in December 2018.  The regional capital is Goaso. It was part of the then Brong-Ahafo Region and contains 6 districts, 3 municipal and 3 ordinary districts. These are:

Ashanti Region

The Ashanti Region of Ghana is made up of 43 districts. This was increased from 30 districts. This is made up of 1 Metropolitan, 19 Municipal and 23 Ordinary districts. These are:

Bono Region

The Bono Region of Ghana was created by a referendum in December 2018. It was part of the then Brong-Ahafo Region and contains 12 districts, 5 municipal and 7 ordinary districts. These are:

Bono East Region

The Bono East Region of Ghana was created by a referendum in December 2018. It was part of the then Brong-Ahafo Region of Ghana and contains 11 districts, 4 municipal and 7 ordinary districts. These are:

Central Region

The Central Region of Ghana contains 22 districts. These are made up of 1 metropolitan, 7 municipal and 14 ordinary districts. There were formally 20 districts in this region.

Eastern Region

The Eastern Region of Ghana contains 33 districts made up of 13 municipal and 20 ordinary districts. These are:

Greater Accra Region

The Greater Accra Region of Ghana contains 29 districts made up of 2 metropolitan, 23 municipal and 4 ordinary districts. These are:

Northern Region

The Northern Region of Ghana contains 16 districts; 1 metropolitan, 5 municipal and 10 ordinary districts. These are:

North East Region

The North East Region of Ghana was created by a referendum in December 2018. It was part of the then Northern Region of Ghana. It contains 6 districts, 2 municipal and 4 ordinary districts. These are:

Oti Region

The Oti Region of Ghana was created by a referendum in December 2018. It was part of the then Volta Region of Ghana. It contains 8 districts, 2 municipal and 6 ordinary districts. These are:

Savannah Region

The Savannah Region of Ghana was created by a referendum in December 2018. It was part of then Northern Region of Ghana. It contains 7 districts, 1 municipal and 6 ordinary districts. These are:

Upper East Region

The Upper East Region of Ghana contains 15 districts, 4 municipal and 11 ordinary districts. There were 13 districts previously.

Upper West Region

The Upper West Region of Ghana contains 11 districts, 5 municipal and 6 ordinary districts. These are:

Volta Region

The Volta Region of Ghana used to contains 17 districts, 5 municipal and 20 ordinary districts. These are: It now has a total of 18 districts made up of 6 municipal and 12 ordinary districts since the regional demarcation in December 2018

Western Region

The Western Region of Ghana contains 14 districts, 1 metropolitan, 8 municipal and 5 ordinary districts. These are:

Western North Region

The Western North Region of Ghana was created by a referendum in December 2018. It was part of the then Western Region of Ghana. It contains 9 districts, 3 municipal and 6 ordinary districts. These are:

See also
 Regions of Ghana
 Administrative divisions of Ghana

Notes

References

External links
 
 GhanaDistricts.com
 This area is password protected Many Pictures Of Ghana
 Berry, LaVerle Bennette: A Country Study: Ghana, Federal Research Division, U.S. Library of Congress. Washington D.C., 1995.

 
Subdivisions of Ghana
Ghana, Districts
Ghana 2
Districts, Ghana
Ghana geography-related lists